In the  statistical theory of the design of experiments, blocking is the arranging of experimental units in groups (blocks) that are similar to one another. Blocking can be used to tackle the problem of pseudoreplication.

Use
Blocking reduces unexplained variability. Its principle lies in the fact that variability which cannot be overcome (e.g. needing two batches of raw material to produce 1 container of a chemical) is confounded or aliased with a(n) (higher/highest order) interaction to eliminate its influence on the end product. High order interactions are usually of the least importance (think of the fact that temperature of a reactor or the batch of raw materials is more important than the combination of the two - this is especially true when more (3, 4, ...) factors are present); thus it is preferable to confound this variability with the higher interaction.

Examples
Male and Female: An experiment is designed to test a new drug on patients. There are two levels of the treatment, drug, and placebo, administered to male and female patients in a double blind trial. The sex of the patient is a blocking factor accounting for treatment variability between males and females.  This reduces sources of variability and thus leads to greater precision.
Elevation: An experiment is designed to test the effects of a new pesticide on a specific patch of grass. The grass area contains a major elevation change and thus consists of two distinct regions - 'high elevation' and 'low elevation'. A treatment group (the new pesticide) and a placebo group are applied to both the high elevation and low elevation areas of grass. In this instance the researcher is blocking the elevation factor which may account for variability in the pesticide's application.
Intervention: Suppose a process is invented that intends to make the soles of shoes last longer, and a plan is formed to conduct a field trial. Given a group of n volunteers, one possible design would be to give n/2 of them shoes with the new soles and n/2 of them shoes with the ordinary soles, randomizing the assignment of the two kinds of soles. This type of experiment is a completely randomized design. Both groups are then asked to use their shoes for a period of time, and then measure the degree of wear of the soles. This is a workable experimental design, but purely from the point of view of statistical accuracy (ignoring any other factors), a better design would be to give each person one regular sole and one new sole, randomly assigning the two types to the left and right shoe of each volunteer. Such a design is called a "randomized complete block design." This design will be more sensitive than the first, because each person is acting as his/her own control and thus the control group is more closely matched to the treatment group block design
In the statistical theory of the design of experiments, blocking is the arranging of experimental units in groups (blocks) that are similar to one another. Typically, a blocking factor is a source of variability that is not of primary interest to the experimenter. An example of a blocking factor might be the sex of a patient; by blocking on sex, this source of variability is controlled for, thus leading to greater accuracy.

When studying Probability Theory the blocks method consists of splitting a sample into blocks (groups) separated by smaller subblocks so that the blocks can be considered almost independent. The blocks method helps proving limit theorems in the case of dependent random variables.

The blocks method was introduced by S. Bernstein:
The method was successfully applied in the theory of sums of dependent random variables and in extreme value theory.

Blocking used for nuisance factors that can be controlled
When we can control nuisance factors, an important technique known as blocking can be used to reduce or eliminate the contribution to experimental error contributed by nuisance factors. The basic concept is to create homogeneous blocks in which the nuisance factors are held constant and the factor of interest is allowed to vary. Within blocks, it is possible to assess the effect of different levels of the factor of interest without having to worry about variations due to changes of the block factors, which are accounted for in the analysis.

Definition of blocking factors
A nuisance factor is used as a blocking factor if every level of the primary factor occurs the same number of times with each level of the nuisance factor. The analysis of the experiment will focus on the effect of varying levels of the primary factor within each block of the experiment.

Block a few of the most important nuisance factors
The general rule is:
"Block what you can; randomize what you cannot."
Blocking is used to remove the effects of a few of the most important nuisance variables. Randomization is then used to reduce the contaminating effects of the remaining nuisance variables. For important nuisance variables, blocking will yield higher significance in the variables of interest than randomizing.

Table
One useful way to look at a randomized block experiment is to consider it as a collection of completely randomized experiments, each run within one of the blocks of the total experiment.

with
L1 = number of levels (settings) of factor 1
L2 = number of levels (settings) of factor 2
L3 = number of levels (settings) of factor 3
L4 = number of levels (settings) of factor 4

Lk = number of levels (settings) of factor k

Example
Suppose engineers at a semiconductor manufacturing facility want to test whether different wafer implant material dosages have a significant effect on resistivity measurements after a diffusion process taking place in a furnace. They have four different dosages they want to try and enough experimental wafers from the same lot to run three wafers at each of the dosages.

The nuisance factor they are concerned with is "furnace run" since it is known that each furnace run differs from the last and impacts many process parameters.

An ideal way to run this experiment would be to run all the 4x3=12 wafers in the same furnace run. That would eliminate the nuisance furnace factor completely. However, regular production wafers have furnace priority, and only a few experimental wafers are allowed into any furnace run at the same time.

A non-blocked way to run this experiment would be to run each of the twelve experimental wafers, in random order, one per furnace run. That would increase the experimental error of each resistivity measurement by the run-to-run furnace variability and make it more difficult to study the effects of the different dosages. The blocked way to run this experiment, assuming you can convince manufacturing to let you put four experimental wafers in a furnace run, would be to put four wafers with different dosages in each of three furnace runs. The only randomization would be choosing which of the three wafers with dosage 1 would go into furnace run 1, and similarly for the wafers with dosages 2, 3 and 4.

Description of the experiment
Let X1 be dosage "level" and X2 be the blocking factor furnace run. Then the experiment can be described as follows:
k = 2 factors (1 primary factor X1 and 1 blocking factor X2)
L1 = 4 levels of factor X1
L2 = 3 levels of factor X2
n = 1 replication per cell
N = L1 * L2 = 4 * 3 = 12 runs

Before randomization, the design trials look like:

Matrix representation
An alternate way of summarizing the design trials would be to use a 4x3 matrix whose 4 rows are the levels of the treatment X1 and whose columns are the 3 levels of the blocking variable X2. The cells in the matrix have indices that match the X1, X2 combinations above.

By extension, note that the trials for any K-factor randomized block design are simply the cell indices of a k dimensional matrix.

Model
The model for a randomized block design with one nuisance variable is

where
Yij is any observation for which X1 = i and X2 = j
X1 is the primary factor
X2 is the blocking factor
μ is the general location parameter (i.e., the mean)
Ti is the effect for being in treatment i (of factor X1)
Bj is the effect for being in block j (of factor X2)

Estimates
Estimate for μ :  = the average of all the data
Estimate for Ti :  with  = average of all Y for which X1 = i.
Estimate for Bj :  with  = average of all Y for which X2 = j.

Generalizations
Generalized randomized block designs (GRBD) allow tests of block-treatment interaction, and has exactly one blocking factor like the RCBD.
Latin squares (and other row-column designs) have two blocking factors that are believed to have no interaction.
Latin hypercube sampling
Graeco-Latin squares
Hyper-Graeco-Latin square designs

Theoretical basis
The theoretical basis of blocking is the following mathematical result. Given random variables, X and Y

The difference between the treatment and the control can thus be given minimum variance (i.e. maximum precision) by maximising the covariance (or the correlation) between X and Y.

See also

Algebraic statistics
Block design
Combinatorial design
Generalized randomized block design
Glossary of experimental design
Optimal design
Paired difference test
Dependent and independent variables
Blockmodeling

References

Bibliography

 Pre-publication chapters are available on-line.

Design of experiments